The Dickinson (Carnegie Area) Public Library on 3rd St. W. in Dickinson, North Dakota was built in 1909 as a Carnegie library, funded by a $12,500 grant.

A 1938 expansion was a Works Project Administration project, with design by Louis W. Veigel.  It was expanded again in 1975 at cost of in 1975 for $224,541.

There is record of architect Joseph Bell DeRemer having association with the building.  It has elements of Classical Revival and Beaux Arts architecture.

It was listed on the National Register of Historic Places in 2008.

See also
List of Carnegie libraries in North Dakota

References

Library buildings completed in 1909
Beaux-Arts architecture in North Dakota
Carnegie libraries in North Dakota
Neoclassical architecture in North Dakota
Libraries on the National Register of Historic Places in North Dakota
National Register of Historic Places in Stark County, North Dakota
1909 establishments in North Dakota
Works Progress Administration in North Dakota
Dickinson, North Dakota